Anna Gurbanova  (born September 24, 1986) is an Azerbaijani rhythmic gymnast.

Career 

She is the champion of Azerbaijan in ball performance, a participant of the Olympic Games held in Athens in 2004, World and European Championships and the world cup final. At the World Championships - 2005 in Baku and the European Championships -2005 in Moscow she won the 5th place in team performances. At the international tournament in Italy, Anna won the first place for her performance with the clubs and received a silver medal in all round competition. She is a bronze medalist of the World Cup-2005 held in Tashkent in the performance with a rope and a silver medalist of an Italian club competition.

External links
 Profile

1986 births
Living people
Azerbaijani rhythmic gymnasts
Olympic gymnasts of Azerbaijan
Gymnasts at the 2004 Summer Olympics
Sportspeople from Baku
Medalists at the Rhythmic Gymnastics World Championships
Medalists at the Rhythmic Gymnastics European Championships
21st-century Azerbaijani women